Álvaro Raul Sofrimento Ramalho (born 20 January 1999) is a Portuguese professional footballer who plays as a goalkeeper for Belenenses SAD.

Club career
Ramalho is a youth product of FC Despertar, Estrela, Benfica, Belenenses, Real SC and Belenenses SAD. He began his senior career as the U23 goalkeeper for B-SAD, before being promoted to the first team in the summer of 2021. Normally the reserve keeper of B-SAD, Ramalho was called to the senior team after a COVID-19 outbreak hit the squad. One of only 9 starters in the squad for the match, he made his professional debut with B-SAD in a 7–0 Primeira Liga loss to Benfica on 24 July 2021 that ended up being called off.

References

External links

1999 births
Living people
Footballers from Lisbon
Portuguese footballers
Portuguese people of Cape Verdean descent
Association football goalkeepers
Belenenses SAD players
Primeira Liga players
Campeonato de Portugal (league) players